, abbreviated as Dai kōdai (大工大), Han kōdai (阪工大), or Osaka kōdai (大阪工大) is a private university in Osaka Prefecture, Japan. OIT has 3 campuses, Omiya campus located in Asahi-ku, Osaka City, Umeda campus located in Kita-ku, Osaka City and Hirakara campus located in Hirakata City.

History
OIT was originally founded in 1922 as Kansai Engineering Technical School by business man Kyosaburo Honjo,  together with architect Yasushi Kataoka, who graduated from Tokyo Imperial University (present University of Tokyo) and also served as the school's first principal. The Mission is "For the World, for the People and for the Community",  to develop specialists with science-based practical skills who play an important role in society.

In 1940, the school foundation established Kansai Advanced Technical School, a three-year college for men (for ages 17–20). Kansai Advanced Technical School was renamed to Setsunan Advanced Technical School in 1942, further renamed Setsunan Engineering Technical School in 1944.

In April 1949, Setsunan Engineering Technical School was upgraded to Setsunan Institute of Technology, a four-year university under Japan's new educational systems. In October 1949, it was renamed to Osaka Institute of Technology (OIT).

At first, OIT had one faculty: the so-called Faculty of Engineering, which consisted of three departments (Architecture, Civil Engineering, Electrical Engineering). Later on, OIT added several departments (Mechanical Engineering, Electronics Engineering, Applied Chemistry, Environmental Engineering, Biomedical Engineering), three faculties (Faculty of Information Science and Technology, Faculty of Intellectual Property, Faculty of Robotics and Design), and a graduate school which includes doctoral-level courses.
1949: Faculty of Engineering
1965: Graduate School (Department of Engineering Research; master's courses only)
1967: Ph.D. courses offered
1996: Faculty of Information Science and Technology
2003: Faculty of Intellectual Property
2017: Faculty of Robotics and Design

As of April 2017, OIT has four faculties. The Faculty of Intellectual Property was the first-ever and is still the only one of its kind in Japan. Moreover, the Faculty of Robotics and Design provides design thinking education to stress an innovative and creative approach towards design.

OIT has three campuses:
Omiya campus: Faculty of Engineering, Faculty of Intellectual Property
Umeda campus: Faculty of Robotics and Design
Hirakata campus: Faculty of Information Science and Technology

The Umeda campus was opened in 2017 near Osaka station and is housed in the 21-storey OIT Umeda Tower, located in the central business district (CBD).

Education
From Academic Year 2017, OIT offers 16 undergraduate degrees and 6 master's degrees in the field of engineering, robotics and design, information science and technology, and intellectual property. It also offers 5 doctoral degrees in the fields of engineering, robotics and design, information science and technology.
OIT offers a number of project-based learning opportunities, including:

Solar car project
Challenge of the OIT MONOLAB robot project
Human-powered aircraft project
Development of wireless electric vehicle charging system (Kawakami-mura eco project)
Science à la carte école project
Smartphone application design project
Computer design project
The IP (intellectual property) PR project

Faculties (undergraduate schools)
 Intellectual property (in Omiya) – the only one and first-ever Faculty in Japan
 Department of Intellectual Property
 Engineering (in Omiya)
 Department of Architecture
 Department of Civil Engineering and Urban Design
 Department of Electrical and Electronic Systems Engineering
 Department of Electronics, Information and Communication Engineering
 Department of Mechanical Engineering
 Department of Applied Chemistry
 Department of Environmental Engineering
 Department of Biomedical Engineering
Robotics and design (in Umeda) *"Design thinking" education as innovative & creative approach
 Department of Robotics
 Department of Design and Architecture
 Department of System Design *IoT, AI
 Information Science and Technology (in Hirakata)
 Department of Computer Science
 Department of Data Science
 Department of Information Systems
 Department of Media Science
 Department of Information Networks

Graduate schools
 Intellectual property (professional degree course)
 Major in intellectual property
 Engineering (master's and Ph.D. courses)
 Major in architecture, civil engineering and urban design
 Major in electrical, electronic, and mechanical engineering
 Major in applied chemistry, environmental, and biomedical engineering
Robotics and design (master's and Ph.D. dourses)
 Major in robotics and design
 Information science and technology (master's and Ph.D. courses)
 Major in information science and technology

Research centers
Omiya campus:
 Center for Monodzukuri management
 Nanomaterials microdevices research center

Umeda campus:
 Human robotics R&D center
 Robotics & design denter

Hiyakata campus:
 Yawata Engineering Laboratories
 Structure research center
 Hydraulic research center
 High voltage research center
 Digital archive center
 Virtual reality laboratory
 Visualization software developing center

Rankings
Times Higher Education World University Rankings(THE) 
Focusing on the field of Engineering & Information Technology, OIT was ranked 801–1000th in the World University Rankings 2021 and ranked in TOP10 Private Universities in Japan. Especially in terms of the Score of “Citations”, OIT was placed next to Osaka University in Japan Universities and higher ranking than Tokyo University of Science and Shibaura Institute of Technology in the Private Universities. Moreover, OIT was ranked 401+ in the Asia University Rankings 2021 as well.

SCImago Institutions Rankings(SIR) 
OIT was ranked 58th in the Japan University Rankings 2019 focusing on the field of “Innovation”  and
75th in Japan University Rankings 2018 focusing on the field of “Research”.

”Truly Strong Universities" for Employment(Toyo Keizai Japan University Rankings)
OIT was ranked 2nd in the Japan University Rankings 2020 and it was the higher ranking than Tokyo University of Science and Shibaura Institute of Technology in the Private Universities. Especially focusing on the field of Information Technology & Digital media, OIT at Faculty of Information Science and Technology was ranked No.1 in 2019 from Institute of technology in Japan.

Innovations

Research
2022: OIT researchers at Department of Applied Chemistry and UMET that is the joint research unit of Lille University of Science and Technology and French National Centre for Scientific Research(CNRS) developed an innovative ‘Micro reaction vessel’ that can initiate a reaction by irradiating light using droplets (Liquid Marbles).
This research was supported by JSPS(Japan Society for the Promotion of Science), and the research paper was published in ‘ACS Applied Materials & Interfaces’.

2021: An international collaborative research group of OIT at Department of Applied Chemistry, Tokyo Institute of Technology and National Yang Ming Chiao Tung University developed an innovative method for preparing ‘Chiral Silica’ consisting of a molecular-scale helical structure by an extremely simple process.
This research was promoted by the moonshot-type research and development project of the New Energy and Industrial Technology Development Organization(NEDO), and was published in the Open Access Journal ‘JACS Au’ of the American Chemical Society (ACS).

2020: A research group of University of Tokyo at Department of Applied Physics, RIKEN(Institute of Physical and Chemical Research) and OIT at Faculty of Information Science and Technology succeeded in developing an innovative “Transportable Optical lattice clock(OLC) with Ultra-precise measurements(10 to the power of minus 18)“ for the first time in the world through a verification testing on validity of Albert Einstein's general theory of relativity at Tokyo Skytree. Compared to conventional space experiments, using the transportable OLC on satellite and rocket, the equivalent experiments are available with a height difference of 10,000 times less.

2019: OIT researchers at Department of Applied Chemistry discovered that poly-3-hexylthiophene(P3HT), a conductive polymer widely used as a material for solar cells and transistors, has a new ability to convert light into heat. Since P3HT dissolves in organic solvents, it can be used as a paint, and can be applied to substrates of various shapes. Also it can be expected to be applied to local heating in a vacuum space or a fine space, such as hyperthermia, which uses heat in an outer space(space station or space shuttle) or kills cancer cells by heat. This innovative research was highly evaluated and published by the American Chemical Society (ACS) in the field of polymer. (Macromolecules 2019, 52, 2,708-717)

2018: OIT researcher at Department of Information Systems, Faculty of Information Science and Technology participated in “KAGRA”(Kamioka Gravitational Wave Detector) Project, a national project managed by Institute for Cosmic Ray Research (ICRR) of University of Tokyo and National Institutes of Natural Sciences(NINS)/National Astronomical Observatory of Japan(NAOJ)/High Energy Accelerator Research Organization(KEK) for Astrophysics & Information systems research on Gravitational-wave observatory. From Institute of technology in Japan, only Tokyo Institute of Technology and OIT were engaged in the project.

2017: OIT researcher at Department of System Design, Faculty of Robotics and Design jointly developed an innovative Odor Measuring Platform that allows them to analyze and evaluate different kinds of odors objectively together with Konica Minolta through open innovation. Based on the platform, Konica Minolta unveiled "Kun Kun"(or "Sniff Sniff") body. "Kun Kun" body, simply consisting of a device and a smartphone application, can measure odors of the scalp, armpits, skin behind the ears, and feet. Measured odor data are sent via Bluetooth and displayed in the smartphone app in 20 seconds or so. Odors are classified into 10 levels, allowing users to objectively decide whether they need to take some deodorizing measures. OIT has been researching ways of distinguishing different odors through neural network-based AI technology using gas sensor.

2016: OIT researcher at Department of Applied Chemistry jointly developed an innovative material transfer technology combining Liquid droplets (Liquid marble) covered with solid particles and Light together with Asahikawa Medical University and Max Planck Institutes. As it makes the Light directly convert into propulsion force, there is no power conversion process like photovoltaic power generation. It is eco-friendly and low-cost as well. The research paper was published in German scientific journal "Advanced Functional Materials".

2015: OIT researcher at Department of Applied Chemistry jointly developed an innovative technology, so-called "Non-sticky powdery adhesive" in the field of Biomimetics materials together with Max Planck Institutes. It was developed with hint that Aphids covers the surface of honey which they discharge by solid wax particles and prevents drowning due to honey in the nest by liquid marble. It was introduced to journal cover published by the Royal Society of Chemistry and Chemistry World in UK.

2012: An innovative Small satellite with Pulsed plasma thruster(PPT), named PROITERES(Project of OIT Electric-Rocket-Engine Onboard Small Space Ship) was developed by OIT researcher and students mainly from Department of Mechanical Engineering and it was launched in Sep 2012 on PSLV-C21 Rocket from Satish Dhawan Space Centre operated by Indian Space Research Organisation in India.

Business
2020: For acceleration of start-up business from Kansai region in Japan, OIT and Kobe University started a joint collaboration to support the University-led ventures in formulating Intellectual Property strategies and business models toward innovation with their venture funds.

2017: Japan's first "Robot Service Business School" was launched by New Energy and Industrial Technology Development Organization (NEDO) at OIT's Robotics & Design Center in OIT Umeda campus in order to provide an integrated education in the technology, design, and business expertise necessary with robotics innovation.

Achievements and awards
International
Students from Faculty of Information Science and Technology monopolistically won the “Best prize” and “1st prize” with defeating University of Tokyo etc in the Japan tournament 2019(Category: C/C++ Programming, 19,967 participants) of “Lan Qiao Cup” that is the largest Collegiate Programming competition in China. As of 2019, the OIT’s winner was ranked as “No.1 C/C++ Programmer” in Japan universities.
OIT researcher at Department of System Design, Faculty of Robotics and Design won the “Sensors and Actuators Award 2018” for his outstanding research achievements at the International Association of Advanced Materials international conference in Stockholm. From the universities in Japan, the Advanced Materials Award was provided only to University of Tokyo and OIT.
Joint team "JoiTech" from Osaka University and OIT won the "World Championship"(*Category: Humanoid League Adult Size) in RoboCup 2013 for Robotics in Eindhoven.Moreover, OIT’s own team ”OIT Trial” from Faculty of Robotics and Design together with Faculty of Information Science and Technology won the “World's No. 7 place” (*Category: @Home) in RoboCup 2017 in Nagoya.
Student team from Department of Electrical and Electronics Systems Engineering won the "3rd prize" and "Best Innovative Design Award" in the international student contest on IFEC(International Future Energy Challenge) 2015 hosted by IEEE at the University of Michigan–Dearborn. The topic was "High-efficiency Wireless Charging System for Electric Vehicles (EV) and other Applications". As Japanese university, OIT got through to the Final Competition and also won the award for the first time ever.
Student from Department of Electrical and Electronics Systems Engineering won the "Excellent Paper Award" in the International Conference on IEEE PEAC(Power Electronics Application Conference) 2014 in Shanghai. The topic was "A New V2H System with Single-Ended Inverter Drive Bidirectional Wireless Resonant IPT.
Student team from Faculty of Information Science and Technology passed the Domestic Preliminary competition(82 universities, 372 teams in Japan) on ACM International Collegiate Programming Contest(“ACM-ICPC”) 2015 and got through to the Asia Regional competition in Tsukuba. From the private universities in Japan, the qualifiers were only 3 universities, Keio University, Meiji University and OIT.In addition, back to the Asia Regional competition 2006, only Tokyo Institute of Technology and OIT were in the “Top 10” from Institute of technology in Japan, and also OIT was the only ranked from private universities in Japan. The OIT graduates who experienced this event joined Google, Yahoo and Information technology(IT) companies.
Graduate student from Electronics, Information and communication Engineering won the "Student Award" in the International symposium on ALC(Atomic Level Characterizations) 2015 for New Materials and Devices in Nagoya. The topic was "Surface potential distribution of insulating film on a conductive substrate irradiated by electron beam with an application of the bias-voltage". From the private universities in Japan, it was awarded only to Tokyo University of Science and OIT.
Graduate student from Electronics, Information and communication Engineering won the "Best Paper Award" in Photomask Japan 2014 organized by SPIE(Society of Photographic Instrumentation Engineers). The topic was "Electron beam current dependence on a surface potential distribution at a resist film on a conductive substrate".
Graduate student from Electronics, Information and communication Engineering won the "Student Travel Award" in the  International Conference on EIPBN(Electron, Ion, and Photon Beam Technology and Nanofabrication) 2012 organized by IEEE Electron Devices Society in Hawaii. The topic was "Measurement of Surface Potential Distribution at an Insulating Film Produced by Fogging Electrons in a Scanning Electron Microscope". A variety of universities, countries, and topics were represented among the students receiving support. Students from 10 countries (including the US) and 33 universities(including MIT, Stanford University, Yale University, Carnegie Mellon University, Princeton University, University of British Columbia and more.) were among the recipients of student travel financial support. From the universities in Asia, it was awarded only to National University of Singapore, Peking University and OIT.
Student from Department of Architecture got through to "The 3rd Asian Contest of Architectural Rookie's Award" in Dalian as a member of Japan national team after winning the “1st prize” in "Kenchiku SHINJINSEN"(Architectural Rookie’s Contest)2014 in Japan.

Notable alumni
Susumu Fujita, Politician and former Chairman of OIT.
Hiroichi Sakai, Politician, a former member of the House of Representatives.
Akio Yamaguchi, President at IBM Japan.
Naosumi Tada, President at ZF Japan.
Hiroyuki Koba, Chief engineer of TOYOTA C-HR.
Hiroshi Yamamoto, Chief engineer of MAZDA  Eunos Cosmo.
Masahiro Umemura, CFO of KYOCERA.
Takakuni Happo, Deputy president of TOKYU RAILWAYS.
Masao Sakaguchi, Deputy president at KINDEN and former Chairman of OIT.
Shinichi Hasegawa, Chairman of PACIFIC CONSULTANTS(PCKK).
Tetsuo Kure, CEO at ALFRESA PHARMA and former Chairman of OIT.
Takehiko Hasegawa, Founder of HASEKO.
Katsuhiko Wakabayashi, Founder of HARDLOCK INDUSTRY providing an innovative nut that never comes loose used by NASA and Railway companies in UK, Australia, Japan and more.
Keiichi Sato, Professor Emeritus at IIT Institute of Design.
Weixing Ma, former Associate professor of School of design & arts at Beijing Institute of Technology.
Masatoshi Tomoi, MS(University of British Columbia), Japanese pioneer in the research of 2x4 Framing by wooden construction of North America in the Architecture.
Masami Tanigawa, PhD(University of Tokyo), AIJ emeritus member, Japanese pioneer in the research of Frank Lloyd Wright.
Yasushi Nishimura, PhD(Kyoto University), Professor Emeritus/Chairman of OIT and former visiting researcher specialised in Architectural engineering at UT Austin.
Akimitsu Kurita, Professor Emeritus at OIT, former visiting researcher at Ruhr University Bochum(RUB) in the research of steel construction for bridge in the Civil engineering.
Takahiro Tanaka, LLM(Washington University in St. Louis), Lawyer, Visiting professor at OIT.
Yoshihide Yanagino, MSc(University of Portsmouth), Patent Attorney, Adjunct instructor at OIT.
Kojiro Kitayama(younger brother of Tadao Ando), Architect and winner of AIA Honor Award together with Peter Eisenman. 
Kohki Hiranuma, Architect and winner of Grand Designs Awards (England), Innovative Architecture International Architectural Award (Italy).
Koichiro Ikebuchi, Interior designer in Singapore and winner of Singapore President’s Design Award (Designer of The Year, 2009).
Sadatoshi Gassan, Japanese Swordsmith and holder of Intangible Cultural Property who has been continuing Gassan Samurai sword tradition for approximately 800 years.
Koshu Tani, Science fiction writer.
Yoshichika Iwasa, Explorer of Polynesia.
Itaru Oki, Jazz trumpeter and flugelhornist.
Carlos Kanno, former Percussionist of Orquesta de la Luz that was salsa band.
Bin Kato, Film director and screenwriter.
Yoshiyuki Abe, Racing cyclist.

Membership/Cooperating organization
IAESTE (International Association for the Exchange of Students for Technical Experience)Japan:
OIT is one of the "University member" and "Business supporting member" as well as The University of Tokyo, Tohoku University, Hokkaido University, Yokohama National University, Tokyo Metropolitan University, Tokyo University of Science and  Waseda University. Especially from the universities in Kansai region, OIT is only listed as "Business supporting member" who can receive foreign trainees.
OIT accepts a limited number of international research students under this program each year, and also dispatches students to other universities.
- Trainees Accepted in OIT from; 2018: Slovak University of Technology (Slovakia)
2017: Gdańsk University of Technology, Lodz University of Technology (Poland)
2016: Brno University of Technology (Czech Republic), Budapest University of Technology and Economics (Hungary)
2015: Kwame Nkrumah University of Science and Technology (Republic of Ghana), Tomas Bata University in Zlín (Czech Republic)
2014: Norwegian University of Science and Technology (Norway), Federal University of Minas Gerais (Brazil)
- Trainees Dispatched from OIT to;
2017: Manipal University (India)
2016: University of Information Science and Technology "St. Paul The Apostle" (North Macedonia)
2014: Karunya University (India)

WIPO(World Intellectual Property Organization)
OIT cooperates with WIPO on organizing the conferences in order to evangelize the Intellectual Property(IP) in Asia. For instance, “Conference for Presidents/Vice-Presidents and Technology Transfer Officers of Universities and Research Institutions on Creating an Enabling Intellectual Property(IP) Environment for Technology Development, Management and Commercialization” in 2017.
The overseas participants were mainly from Philippines, Thailand, Malaysia, Indonesia and Sri Lanka.    

JICA(Japan International Cooperation Agency)
OIT supports as Training Institution for JICA Training Course mainly related to Intellectual Property, such as "Japan-Mexico Strategic Global Partnership Training Program - Intellectual property rights".

Other than Mexico, OIT received the trainees from Brazil, Argentina and Paraguay.

Overseas Partner Universities
  Australia
Queensland University of Technology
Swinburne University of Technology
  Austria
Vienna University of Technology
  Canada
OCAD University
  Hong Kong
City University of Hong Kong
  China
Tsinghua University
Zhejiang University
Tongji University
East China University of Science and Technology
University of Science and Technology Beijing
  Finland
Tampere University of Technology
  France
EPITECH(Paris Graduate School of Digital Innovation, formerly European Institute of Information Technology)
University of Montpellier
University of Bordeaux
  Germany
Technical University of Munich
Bundeswehr University Munich
University of Wuppertal
Hochschule Hildesheim/Holzminden/Göttingen
  India
Manipal University
  Indonesia
Hasanuddin University
University of Palangka Raya
Widya Mandala Catholic University
Mulawarman University
Bakrie University
  Malaysia
University of Technology Malaysia
University Technology Petronas
University Malaysia Sabah
  Mexico
University of Guanajuato
  Mongolia
Mongolian Institute of Engineering and Technology
  Netherlands
Delft University of Technology
Eindhoven University of Technology
  Norway
University of Stavanger
  Philippines
University of San Jose–Recoletos
  Poland
Wrocław University of Technology
  Saudi Arabia
King Abdulaziz University
  Singapore
Singapore University of Technology and Design
  South Korea
Chung-Ang University
Inje University
Kookmin University
Daejeon University
  Spain
University of Salamanca
Technical University of Madrid
  Sweden
Uppsala University
  Taiwan
National Taipei University of Technology
National Taiwan University of Science and Technology
National Tsing Hua University
National Yang Ming Chiao Tung University
National Chung Hsing University
National Formosa University
National Yunlin University of Science and Technology
National Kaohsiung First University of Science and Technology
Southern Taiwan University of Science and Technology
Shih Hsin University
Tatung University
  Thailand
Chulalongkorn University
Thammasat University
Rajamangala University of Technology Thanyaburi
Thai-Nichi Institute of Technology
  United States
Georgia Institute of Technology
San Jose State University
Rice University
Clemson University
University of Nevada, Reno
San Francisco State University
Angelo State University
  Vietnam
Da Nang University of Technology
Can Tho University

References

External links
 Official site

Private universities and colleges in Japan
Engineering universities and colleges in Japan
Education in Osaka
Universities and colleges in Osaka Prefecture
Kansai Collegiate American Football League